MacLafferty is a surname. Notable people with the surname include:

James H. MacLafferty (1871–1937), U.S. Representative from California
Fred McLafferty (1923–2021), American chemist known for his work in mass spectrometry

See also
McClafferty